Perry Crossing is an unincorporated community in Union Township, Clark County, Indiana, United States.

Geography

References

Unincorporated communities in Clark County, Indiana
Unincorporated communities in Indiana
Louisville metropolitan area